Sadowice may refer to the following places in Poland:
Sadowice, Strzelin County in Gmina Kondratowice, Strzelin County in Lower Silesian Voivodeship (SW Poland)
Sadowice, Wrocław County in Gmina Kąty Wrocławskie, Wrocław County in Lower Silesian Voivodeship (SW Poland)